Josie – also known as Upper Josie – is an unincorporated community in Pike County, Alabama, United States.  It  was named for Josie Lawson, who was the daughter of local merchant Joe Lawson. Josie was formerly served by a local school. A post office operated  under the name Josie from 1881 to 1907.

References

Unincorporated communities in Pike County, Alabama
Unincorporated communities in Alabama